Pompeo is both a masculine Italian given name and a surname, derived from the Roman "Pompeius". Notable people with the name include:

Given name:
Pompeo Aldrovandi (1668–1752), Italian Cardinal of the Roman Catholic Church
Pompeo Aldrovandini (1677–1735), Italian painter of the Baroque period
Pompeo Batoni (1708–1787), Italian painter 
Pompeo Cannicciari (1670–1744), Italian composer
Pompeo Colonna (1479–1532), Italian Cardinal, politician and condottiero
Pompeo Coppini (1870–1957), Italian sculptor who emigrated to the United States
Pompeo D'Ambrosio (1917–1998), Italian who became a Venezuelan businessman
Pompeo Ghitti (1631–1703), Italian painter of the Baroque period
Pompeo Landulfo (1515–1590), Italian painter of the Renaissance period
Pompeo Marchesi (born 1790), Lombard sculptor of the neoclassical school
Pompeo Posar (1921–2004), Playboy magazine staff photographer
Pompeo Targone, Italian military engineer in the service of Ambrose Spinola

Surname:
Ellen Pompeo (born 1969), American actress, plays Meredith Grey on the ABC medical drama Grey's Anatomy
Mike Pompeo (born 1963), former U.S. Secretary of State, former Director of Central Intelligence Agency, former U.S. Representative for Kansas's 4th congressional district
Isadora Pompeo (born 1999), Brazilian vlogger, singer and composer of Christian music

See also
 The Last Days of Pompeo, a 1937 Italian comedy film directed by Mario Mattoli
Il Pompeo, a dramma per musica in 3 acts by composer Alessandro Scarlatti
Pompeo Magno (Pompeius Magnus) is an opera in three acts by Francesco Cavalli
Christophe Di Pompeo (born 1964), French politician

Given names
Surnames
Italian masculine given names
Italian-language surnames